Konstantinos Tsirigotis (born 10 March 2001) is a Greek professional footballer who plays as a centre-back for Super League club Ionikos.

References

2001 births
Living people
Greek footballers
Super League Greece 2 players
Super League Greece players
Ionikos F.C. players
Association football defenders